Charles Henry Sampson (1859-1936) was Principal of Brasenose College, Oxford, from 1920  until his death.

Sampson was born in Bristol and educated at Bristol Grammar School and Balliol College, Oxford. A mathematician, he became a Fellow of Brasenose in 1882; a Tutor in 1884; and a Senior Tutor in 1894.

His son Ronald died in the Great War. Sampson himself died on 5 November 1936.

Notes

1859 births
1936 deaths
Scientists from Bristol
People educated at Bristol Grammar School
Alumni of Balliol College, Oxford
Fellows of Brasenose College, Oxford
Principals of Brasenose College, Oxford
19th-century English mathematicians
20th-century English mathematicians